Denis James O'Sullivan (5 March 1918 – 20 July 1987) was an Irish Fine Gael politician. He was first elected to Dáil Éireann at his second attempt at the 1951 general election. He served as a Fine Gael Teachta Dála (TD) for various Cork constituencies until losing his seat at the 1965 general election. He served in the Second Inter-Party Government of John A. Costello as Government Chief Whip. He was a member of Seanad Éireann from 1965 to 1969.

References

 

1918 births
1987 deaths
Fine Gael TDs
Members of the 11th Seanad
Members of the 14th Dáil
Members of the 15th Dáil
Members of the 16th Dáil
Members of the 17th Dáil
Politicians from County Cork
Parliamentary Secretaries of the 15th Dáil
Fine Gael senators
Government Chief Whip (Ireland)